Justin Dominique McCray (May 31, 1992) is an American football guard for the Carolina Panthers of the National Football League (NFL). He played college football at UCF.

College career
McCray attended the University of Central Florida, playing from 2010 to 2013.

Professional career

Tennessee Titans
McCray signed with the Tennessee Titans as an undrafted free agent on May 12, 2014. He was waived on August 30, 2014, and was signed to the practice squad the next day. After spending his entire rookie season on the practice squad, he signed a futures contract with the Titans on December 29, 2014.

On August 30, 2015, McCray was waived by the Titans.

Arena Football League
McCray then joined the Arena Football League with the Orlando Predators, where McCray played with his brother Jordan. On October 14, 2016, McCray was assigned to the Tampa Bay Storm during the dispersal draft.

Green Bay Packers
On March 29, 2017, McCray signed with the Green Bay Packers. After making the Packers 53-man roster, McCray earned his first career start in Week 2 at right tackle in place of an injured Bryan Bulaga. He then made his eighth start in the last game of the season on December 31, 2017.

He was re-signed on March 12, 2018.

Cleveland Browns
On August 31, 2019, McCray was traded to the Cleveland Browns.

Atlanta Falcons
On March 27, 2020, McCray signed a one-year contract with the Atlanta Falcons.

Houston Texans
McCray signed a two-year contract with the Houston Texans on March 22, 2021.

Carolina Panthers
On March 17, 2023, McCray signed with the Carolina Panthers.

References

External links
McCray's interview for the Journal of Sports

1992 births
Living people
Players of American football from Miami
Miami Southridge Senior High School alumni
American football offensive guards
American football offensive tackles
UCF Knights football players
Tennessee Titans players
Orlando Predators players
Tampa Bay Storm players
Green Bay Packers players
Atlanta Falcons players
Houston Texans players
Cleveland Browns players